The Pennsylvania State Game Lands Number 45 are Pennsylvania State Game Lands in Clarion and Venango Counties in Pennsylvania in the United States providing hunting, bird watching, and other activities.

Geography
State Game Lands Number 45 is located in Ashland Township in Clarion County, and in Cranberry, Pinegrove and Rockland Townships in Venango County.

Statistics

References

045
Protected areas of Clarion County, Pennsylvania
Protected areas of Venango County, Pennsylvania